Meridulia is a genus of moths of the family Tortricidae.

Species
Meridulia chaenostium Razowski & Wojtusiak, 2006
Meridulia meridana Razowski & Wojtusiak, 2006
Meridulia zerpana Razowski & Wojtusiak, 2006

Etymology
The genus name is a combination of Eulia and the province of Mérida in Venezuela.

See also
List of Tortricidae genera

References

 , 2006: Tortricidae from Venezuela (Lepidoptera: Tortricidae). Shilap Revista de Lepidopterologia 34 (133): 35–79. Full article:

External links
tortricidae.com

Euliini
Tortricidae of South America
Tortricidae genera